Rubina Gillani is a Pakistani medical doctor and public health specialist from the Khyber Pakhtunkhwa Province.
 
She trained as a general practitioner and worked for the Pakistan Air Force for six years.

Gillani was the Fred Hollows Foundation's Country Manager in Pakistan since 1998, but  left it in 2014. As Country Manager, she did managerial work but still sees herself as a 'field worker'. 

The Foundation has been working with local blindness prevention agencies in Pakistan since 1997, such as The Pakistan Institute of Community Ophthalmology and the Khyber Eye Foundation. In 1998 Gillani undertook a  situational analysis w i to determine the prevalence of blindness in Pakistan.
She spoke at The Foundation's IMG meeting in October 2003 in Sydney, Australia on the importance of sustainability and The Foundation's role as a development organisation.

In 2006 she met Australian Prime Minister John Howard in Canberra resulting in the Australian Government’s decision to fund the eye program in Pakistan for a further 5 years.

In 2009, the Australian Federal Government announced more than $5-million in extra funding for the Foundation’s program in Pakistan that is restoring the sight of thousands of people in remote areas.

In February 2012, Gillani visited the Ophthalmology Department of the Khyber Teaching Hospital and handed over equipment worth Rs 5 million to the hospital.

From 2015 to 2018 she served on the Board of Governors of the Hayatabad Medical Complex, Peshawar.

References

Living people
Pakistani general practitioners
Place of birth missing (living people)
Year of birth missing (living people)
Pakistani military doctors
Pakistan Air Force civilians